William Creese (15 January 1870 – 23 October 1918) was a South African cricket umpire. He stood in one Test match, South Africa vs. Australia, in 1902. He was killed in action during World War I.

See also
 List of Test cricket umpires
 Australian cricket team in South Africa in 1902–03

References

1870 births
1918 deaths
People from Usk
Sportspeople from Monmouthshire
South African Test cricket umpires
Welsh cricketers
Gauteng cricketers
Monmouthshire cricketers
Marylebone Cricket Club cricketers
South African military personnel killed in World War I